The US Yachts US 29 is an American sailboat that was designed by Doug Peterson as a racer-cruiser and first built in 1977.

The design is a unauthorized development of Peterson's International Offshore Rule Half Ton class Chaser 29 racer. The US 29 molds were later sold to Pearson Yachts and developed into the Triton 30 in 1985.

Production
The design was built by US Yachts in the United States, starting in 1977, but it is now out of production.

Design
The US 29 is a recreational keelboat, built predominantly of fiberglass, with wood trim. It has a masthead sloop rig, a raked stem, a reverse transom, an internally mounted spade-type rudder controlled by a wheel and a fixed fin keel. It displaces  and carries  of ballast.

The boat is fitted with a Swedish Volvo MD7 diesel engine for docking and maneuvering.

See also
List of sailing boat types

References

Keelboats
1980s sailboat type designs
Sailing yachts 
Sailboat type designs by Doug Peterson
Sailboat types built by US Yachts